Maro Prapancham is a 1970 Telugu-language film, produced by Akkineni Nageswara Rao and Adurthi Subba Rao under the Chakravarthy Chitra banner and directed by Adurthi Subba Rao. It stars Akkineni Nageswara Rao, Savitri, Jamuna and music composed by K. V. Mahadevan.

Plot
During the time of Gandhji's centenary birth celebrations, several leaders & social reformers give messages regarding the ideologies of Gandhi which they do not follow in real life. At this point in time, 9 youngsters who are fed up with these double-standards form into an organization and kidnap children from all over the country. They create a special world called Maro Prapancham where jealousy, rivalry, caste & community do not exist, even Goddess of India (Jamuna) lands at the place. The existence of such a place creates huge uproar in the country and the Central Govt appoints Special CBI Officer Ravindra Nath (Akkineni Nageswara Rao) to solve the case.

Ravindra eventually manages to find the different world after various setbacks. He finds the place filled with piety, truth, peace, kindness & mercy. He is inspired by this and he himself decides to join with the organisation that made the "Maro Prapancham" (Another World). When a few of the members are caught and prosecuted, Ravindra arrives and takes the judiciary to the Maro Prapancham, to describe its uniqueness and what they were trying to achieve. Yet, the judiciary is unmoved and judges them guilty, sentencing Ravindra along with the people caught. Thereupon, children obstruct the Police and demand their leaders be set free. Ravindra explains to them that the children are now independent and can carry on on their own, and orders them to make the entire country a different world. The movie ends with the children proceeding towards the Maro Prapancham.

Cast
Akkineni Nageswara Rao as CBI Officer Ravindra Nath 
Savitri as Sarada
Jamuna as Bharata Maata
Gummadi as I.G. Jagannatha Rao
Padmanabham
Sakshi Ranga Rao as Sanyasi Rao 
Mada as Peda Gandhi 
Vijayachander 
Venkateswara Rao as Narasimha Rao 
Suryakantham
Pushpa Kumari as Rukmini 
Radha Kumari as Godavari 
Meena Kumari

Crew
Art: G. V. Subba Rao
Choreography: Venu Gopal
Dialogues: Modukuri Johnson
Lyrics: Sri Sri
Playback: S. P. Balasubrahmanyam, S. Janaki
Music: K. V. Mahadevan
Story: B. S. Thapa
Screenplay: K. Viswanath
Editing: B. Gopala Rao, Adurthi Haranath
Cinematography: K. S. Ramakrishna Rao
Producer: Akkineni Nageswara Rao, Adurthi Subba Rao
Director: Adurthi Subba Rao
Banner: Chakravarthi Chitra
Release Date: 10 April 1970

Soundtrack

Music composed by K. V. Mahadevan.

Other
 VCDs and DVDs on - VOLGA Videos, Hyderabad

References

Indian drama films
Films scored by K. V. Mahadevan
Films directed by Adurthi Subba Rao
1970s Telugu-language films